This is a list of schools in Sejong City.

Senior high schools
All schools are public schools.
Bugang Engineering High School
Chochiwon Girls' High School
Hansol High School
Sejong Academy of Science and Arts
Sejong High School
Seongnam High School or Sungnam High School

Middle schools
All schools are public schools.
Areum Middle School
Bugang Middle School
Chochiwon Middle School
Chochiwon Girls' Middle School
Dajeong Middle School
Duru Middle School
Cho Darm Middle School
Dodam Middle School
Duru Middle School
Eojin Middle School
Geonui Middle School
Geumho Middle School
Gowoon Middle School
Hansol Middle School
Jangki Middle School
Jiu Middle School
Jongchon Middle School
Saerom Middle School
Saetteum Middle School
Saeum Middle School
Suhyun Middle School
Yangji Middle School
Yeondong Middle School
Yeonseo Middle School

Elementary schools
All schools are public schools.
Bangok Elementary School
Boram Elementary School
Bugang Elementary School
Chamsam Elementary School
Chochiwon Daedong Elementary School
Chochiwon Kyodong Elementary School
Chochiwon Myeongdong Elementary School
Chochiwon Shinbong Elementary School
Geonui Elementary School
Hangyeol Elementary School
Hansol Elementary School
Jangki Elementary School
Jeondong Elementary School
Jeonui Elementary School
Kamsung Elementary School
Keumnam Elementary School
Sojeong Elementary School
Solbit Elementary School
Soowang Elementary School
Ssangryu Elementary School
Uirang Elementary School
Yeonbong Elementary School
Yeondong Elementary School
Yeongidowon Elementary School
Yeonnam Elementary School
Yeonseo Elementary school
Yeoul Elementary School

References

 
Sejong City